Fairclough is a surname. A variant form is Faircloth. Notable people with the surname include:

Adam Fairclough, British historian of the United States
Anna Fairclough (born 1957), member of the Alaska House of Representatives
Arthur Fairclough (manager) (born 1873), Soccer manager
Arthur Bradfield Fairclough (1896–1968), Canadian First World War flying ace
Ben Fairclough (born 1989), English soccer player
Chris Fairclough (born 1964), soccer player
David Fairclough (born 1957), Liverpool footballer in the 1970s
Dennis Fairclough, Computing & Networking professor
Ellen Fairclough (1905–2004), first female member of the Canadian Cabinet
Eric Fairclough, Canadian politician
Leonard Fairclough (1853–1927), English stonemason
founder of Leonard Fairclough & Son, a construction firm
Les Fairclough (1902–1951), English professional rugby league player
Lora Fairclough (born 1970), English professional golfer
Mick Fairclough (born 1952), Irish professional soccer player
Norman Fairclough (born 1941), linguist
Paul Fairclough (born 1950), soccer manager
Percy Fairclough (1858–1947), English amateur footballer
Peter Fairclough (cricketer) (1887–1952), English cricketer
Peter Fairclough (footballer) (1893–1953), English footballer
Richard Fairclough (divine) (1621–1682), nonconformist divine
Samuel Fairclough (1594–1677), English nonconformist divine

Fictional characters
Len Fairclough, character in the soap opera Coronation Street
Rita Fairclough, character in the soap opera Coronation Street
Stanley Fairclough, character in the soap opera Coronation Street

See also
Fairclough Homes, UK housebuilder part of Centex Corporation